Poul Agger is a Danish sprint canoeist who competed in the late 1940s and early 1950s. He won three medals at the ICF Canoe Sprint World Championships with a silver (K-1 4 x 500 m: 1950) and two bronze (K-1 500 m and K-1 4 x 500 m: both 1948).

Note that the K-1 500 m and K-1 4 x 500 m events were separate from the canoeing competitions at the 1948 Summer Olympics in London. The K-1 500 m has been in the Summer Olympics since the 1976 Games in Montreal while the K-1 4 x 500 m event was only held once at the 1960 Games in Rome.

References

Danish male canoeists
Living people
Year of birth missing (living people)
ICF Canoe Sprint World Championships medalists in kayak